Johannes Olai Olsen (3 October 1895 – 16 January 1974) was a Norwegian fisher and politician for the Labour Party.

He was born in Måsøy.

He was elected to the Norwegian Parliament from Finnmark in 1945, and was re-elected on four occasions.

Olsen was mayor of Måsøy municipality between 1928 and 1946, with the exception of a period between 1940 and 1945, during the German occupation of Norway. He was also a long-time member of Finnmark county council.

His son Trygve Olsen later became mayor of Måsøy, as well as a cabinet member.

References

1895 births
1974 deaths
People from Måsøy
Labour Party (Norway) politicians
Mayors of Måsøy
Members of the Storting
Place of death missing
20th-century Norwegian politicians